The 1998–99 NBA season was the Pacers' 23rd season in the National Basketball Association, and 32nd season as a franchise. On March 23, 1998, the owners of all 29 NBA teams voted 27–2 to reopen the league's collective bargaining agreement, seeking changes to the league's salary cap system, and a ceiling on individual player salaries. The National Basketball Players Association (NBPA) opposed to the owners' plan, and wanted raises for players who earned the league's minimum salary. After both sides failed to reach an agreement, the owners called for a lockout, which began on July 1, 1998, putting a hold on all team trades, free agent signings and training camp workouts, and cancelling many NBA regular season and preseason games. Due to the lockout, the NBA All-Star Game, which was scheduled to be played in Philadelphia on February 14, 1999, was also cancelled. However, on January 6, 1999, NBA commissioner David Stern, and NBPA director Billy Hunter finally reached an agreement to end the lockout. The deal was approved by both the players and owners, and was signed on January 20, ending the lockout after 204 days. The regular season began on February 5, and was cut short to just 50 games instead of the regular 82-game schedule.

The Pacers entered the season as a heavy favorite, because Michael Jordan retired and other members of the Chicago Bulls were broken up by their management. During the off-season, the team signed free agent Sam Perkins, who played in the 1991 NBA Finals with the Los Angeles Lakers, and the 1996 NBA Finals with the Seattle SuperSonics. The Pacers got off to a 15–5 start, then won their final four games to capture the Central Division title with a record of 33 wins and 17 losses.

Reggie Miller led the team in scoring averaging 18.4 points per game, while Rik Smits averaged 14.9 points and 5.6 rebounds per game, and Chris Mullin provided the team with 10.3 points per game. In addition, sixth man Jalen Rose contributed 11.1 points per game off the bench, while other sixth man Antonio Davis provided with 9.4 points and 7.0 rebounds per game. Dale Davis averaged 8.0 points and 8.3 rebounds per game, Mark Jackson provided with 7.6 points and 7.9 assists per game, and Travis Best contributed 7.1 points and 3.4 assists per game off the bench. Rose and Antonio Davis both finished tied in third place in Sixth Man of the Year voting.

In the playoffs, the Pacers swept the Milwaukee Bucks, 3–0 in the Eastern Conference First Round, and swept the 6th-seeded Philadelphia 76ers, 4–0 in the Eastern Conference Semi-finals. The Pacers advanced to the Eastern Conference Finals for the second consecutive season, and the fourth time in six seasons. Once again, the Pacers were up against the New York Knicks, who were the #8 seed in the Eastern Conference. One notable highlight of the series was in Game 3, when Knicks forward Larry Johnson hit a three-pointer while being fouled by Antonio Davis, then completing a 4-point play after hitting a free throw; the Knicks won the game at home, 92–91 to take a 2–1 series lead. Despite being the 8th-seeded team, the Knicks upset the Pacers in six games to reach the NBA Finals for the second time in six seasons, where they lost in five games to the San Antonio Spurs.

It was also the final season the Pacers played at Market Square Arena, moving to the Conseco Fieldhouse the following season. Also following the season, Antonio Davis was traded to the Toronto Raptors. For the season, the Pacers added gold pinstripe alternate road uniforms with navy blue side panels, which remained in use until 2005.

Offseason

NBA Draft

Roster

Regular season

Season standings

z - clinched division title
y - clinched division title
x - clinched playoff spot

Record vs. opponents

Game log

Regular season

|- align="center" bgcolor="#ccffcc"
| 1
| February 5, 1999
| Washington
| W 96–81
|
|
|
| Market Square Arena
| 1–0
|- align="center" bgcolor="#ffcccc"
| 2
| February 7, 1999
| @ Detroit
| L 98–107
|
|
|
| The Palace of Auburn Hills
| 1–1
|- align="center" bgcolor="#ccffcc"
| 3
| February 8, 1999
| @ Cleveland
| W 95–89
|
|
|
| Gund Arena
| 2–1
|- align="center" bgcolor="#ffcccc"
| 4
| February 10, 1999
| @ Portland
| L 92–100
|
|
|
| Rose Garden
| 2–2
|- align="center" bgcolor="#ccffcc"
| 5
| February 11, 1999
| @ Vancouver
| W 101–97
|
|
|
| General Motors Place
| 3–2
|- align="center" bgcolor="#ccffcc"
| 6
| February 14, 1999
| @ L.A. Lakers
| W 101–99
|
|
|
| Great Western Forum
| 4–2
|- align="center" bgcolor="#ffcccc"
| 7
| February 16, 1999
| Miami
| L 78–89
|
|
|
| Market Square Arena
| 4–3
|- align="center" bgcolor="#ccffcc"
| 8
| February 18, 1999
| Philadelphia
| W 99–95
|
|
|
| Market Square Arena
| 5–3
|- align="center" bgcolor="#ccffcc"
| 9
| February 20, 1999
| @ Milwaukee
| W 82–80
|
|
|
| Bradley Center
| 6–3
|- align="center" bgcolor="#ccffcc"
| 10
| February 21, 1999
| New Jersey
| W 80–79
|
|
|
| Market Square Arena
| 7–3
|- align="center" bgcolor="#ccffcc"
| 11
| February 24, 1999
| Toronto
| W 104–84
|
|
|
| Market Square Arena
| 8–3
|- align="center" bgcolor="#ccffcc"
| 12
| February 25, 1999
| @ Cleveland
| W 81–74
|
|
|
| Gund Arena
| 9–3
|- align="center" bgcolor="#ffcccc"
| 13
| February 26, 1999
| @ Orlando
| L 100–103 (OT)
|
|
|
| Orlando Arena
| 9–4

|- align="center" bgcolor="#ccffcc"
| 14
| March 2, 1999
| Denver
| W 88–81
|
|
|
| Market Square Arena
| 10–4
|- align="center" bgcolor="#ccffcc"
| 15
| March 3, 1999
| @ Washington
| W 106–95
|
|
|
| MCI Center
| 11–4
|- align="center" bgcolor="#ffcccc"
| 16
| March 5, 1999
| Golden State
| L 83–102
|
|
|
| Market Square Arena
| 11–5
|- align="center" bgcolor="#ccffcc"
| 17
| March 7, 1999
| Miami
| W 85–72
|
|
|
| Market Square Arena
| 12–5
|- align="center" bgcolor="#ccffcc"
| 18
| March 10, 1999
| New Jersey
| W 93–82
|
|
|
| Market Square Arena
| 13–5
|- align="center" bgcolor="#ccffcc"
| 19
| March 12, 1999
| Milwaukee
| W 109–104
|
|
|
| Market Square Arena
| 14–5
|- align="center" bgcolor="#ccffcc"
| 20
| March 14, 1999
| Boston
| W 99–96
|
|
|
| Market Square Arena
| 15–5
|- align="center" bgcolor="#ffcccc"
| 21
| March 16, 1999
| Atlanta
| L 79–85
|
|
|
| Market Square Arena
| 15–6
|- align="center" bgcolor="#ffcccc"
| 22
| March 17, 1999
| @ Philadelphia
| L 110–114
|
|
|
| First Union Center
| 15–7
|- align="center" bgcolor="#ccffcc"
| 24
| March 20, 1999
| @ Miami
| W 94–89
|
|
|
| Miami Arena
| 17–7
|- align="center" bgcolor="#ccffcc"
| 25
| March 22, 1999
| Washington
| W 90–86
|
|
|
| Market Square Arena
| 18–7
|- align="center" bgcolor="#ffcccc"
| 26
| March 24, 1999
| @ Atlanta
| L 102–103
|
|
|
| Georgia Dome
| 18–8
|- align="center" bgcolor="#ccffcc"
| 27
| March 26, 1999
| @ New Jersey
| W 100–91
|
|
|
| Continental Airlines Arena
| 19–8
|- align="center" bgcolor="#ccffcc"
| 28
| March 28, 1999
| @ Boston
| W 101–93
|
|
|
| FleetCenter
| 20–8
|- align="center" bgcolor="#ffcccc"
| 29
| March 29, 1999
| Atlanta
| L 82–83
|
|
|
| Market Square Arena
| 20–9
|- align="center" bgcolor="#ffcccc"
| 30
| March 30, 1999
| @ New York
| L 93–94
|
|
|
| Madison Square Garden
| 20–10

|- align="center" bgcolor="#ffcccc"
| 31
| April 1, 1999
| @ Toronto
| L 87–88
|
|
|
| Air Canada Centre
| 20–11
|- align="center" bgcolor="#ccffcc"
| 32
| April 2, 1999
| @ Charlotte
| W 87–81
|
|
|
| Charlotte Coliseum
| 21–11
|- align="center" bgcolor="#ccffcc"
| 33
| April 4, 1999
| New York
| W 108–95
|
|
|
| Market Square Arena
| 22–11
|- align="center" bgcolor="#ccffcc"
| 34
| April 5, 1999
| @ Detroit
| W 88–86
|
|
|
| The Palace of Auburn Hills
| 23–11
|- align="center" bgcolor="#ffcccc"
| 36
| April 9, 1999
| Detroit
| L 101–102
|
|
|
| Market Square Arena
| 24–12
|- align="center" bgcolor="#ffcccc"
| 37
| April 10, 1999
| Charlotte
| L 90–92
|
|
|
| Market Square Arena
| 24–13
|- align="center" bgcolor="#ccffcc"
| 38
| April 12, 1999
| @ Toronto
| W 109–99
|
|
|
| Air Canada Centre
| 25–13
|- align="center" bgcolor="#ccffcc"
| 39
| April 14, 1999
| Orlando
| W 83–80
|
|
|
| Market Square Arena
| 26–13
|- align="center" bgcolor="#ffcccc"
| 40
| April 16, 1999
| @ Philadelphia
| L 83–93
|
|
|
| First Union Center
| 26–14
|- align="center" bgcolor="#ffcccc"
| 41
| April 18, 1999
| @ Miami
| L 88–92
|
|
|
| Miami Arena
| 26–15
|- align="center" bgcolor="#ccffcc"
| 42
| April 19, 1999
| @ Boston
| W 120–104
|
|
|
| FleetCenter
| 27–15
|- align="center" bgcolor="#ccffcc"
| 43
| April 21, 1999
| Milwaukee
| W 108–100 (OT)
|
|
|
| Market Square Arena
| 28–15
|- align="center" bgcolor="#ffcccc"
| 45
| April 25, 1999
| @ New Jersey
| L 98–120
|
|
|
| Continental Airlines Arena
| 29–16
|- align="center" bgcolor="#ffcccc"
| 46
| April 27, 1999
| Orlando
| L 87–88
|
|
|
| Market Square Arena
| 29–17
|- align="center" bgcolor="#ccffcc"
| 47
| April 29, 1999
| Charlotte
| W 115–100 (OT)
|
|
|
| Market Square Arena
| 30–17
|- align="center" bgcolor="#ccffcc"
| 48
| April 30, 1999
| @ Atlanta
| W 92–90 (OT)
|
|
|
| Georgia Dome
| 31–17

|- align="center" bgcolor="#ccffcc"
| 49
| May 2, 1999
| New York
| W 94–71
|
|
|
| Market Square Arena
| 32–17
|- align="center" bgcolor="#ccffcc"
| 50
| May 4, 1999
| Cleveland
| W 100–78
|
|
|
| Market Square Arena
| 33–17

Playoffs

|- align="center" bgcolor="#ccffcc"
| 1
| May 9, 1999
| Milwaukee
| W 110–88
| Rose (24)
| D. Davis (15)
| Jackson (12)
| Market Square Arena16,560
| 1–0
|- align="center" bgcolor="#ccffcc"
| 2
| May 11, 1999
| Milwaukee
| W 108–107 (OT)
| Miller (30)
| A. Davis (8)
| Rose (8)
| Market Square Arena16,608
| 2–0
|- align="center" bgcolor="#ccffcc"
| 3
| May 13, 1999
| @ Milwaukee
| W 99–91
| Miller (33)
| D. Davis (7)
| Jackson (10)
| Bradley Center18,717
| 3–0
|-

|- align="center" bgcolor="#ccffcc"
| 1
| May 17, 1999
| Philadelphia
| W 94–90
| Rose (27)
| A. Davis (10)
| Jackson (6)
| Market Square Arena16,723
| 1–0
|- align="center" bgcolor="#ccffcc"
| 2
| May 19, 1999
| Philadelphia
| W 85–82
| Smits (25)
| D. Davis (14)
| Jackson (14)
| Market Square Arena16,795
| 2–0
|- align="center" bgcolor="#ccffcc"
| 3
| May 21, 1999
| @ Philadelphia
| W 97–86
| Miller (29)
| D. Davis (11)
| Jckson (10)
| First Union Center20,930
| 3–0
|- align="center" bgcolor="#ccffcc"
| 4
| May 23, 1999
| @ Philadelphia
| W 89–86
| Miller (23)
| D. Davis (13)
| Jackson (13)
| First Union Center20,844
| 4–0
|-

|- align="center" bgcolor="#ffcccc"
| 1
| May 30, 1999
| New York
| L 90–93
| Miller (19)
| A. Davis,Jackson (7)
| Jackson (11)
| Market Square Arena16,575
| 0–1
|- align="center" bgcolor="#ccffcc"
| 2
| June 1, 1999
| New York
| W 88–86
| Jackson (17)
| D. Davis (12)
| Jackson (8)
| Market Square Arena16,586
| 1–1
|- align="center" bgcolor="#ffcccc"
| 3
| June 5, 1999
| @ New York
| L 91–92
| Smits (25)
| A. Davis (8)
| Jackson (9)
| Madison Square Garden19,763
| 1–2
|- align="center" bgcolor="#ccffcc"
| 4
| June 7, 1999
| @ New York
| W 90–78
| Rose (19)
| D. Davis (12)
| Jackson (4)
| Madison Square Garden19,763
| 2–2
|- align="center" bgcolor="#ffcccc"
| 5
| June 9, 1999
| New York
| L 94–101
| Miller (30)
| D. Davis (18)
| Jackson (4)
| Market Square Arena16,541
| 2–3
|- align="center" bgcolor="#ffcccc"
| 6
| June 11, 1999
| @ New York
| L 82–90
| Smits (20)
| D. Davis (12)
| Jackson,Miller (4)
| Madison Square Garden19,763
| 2–4
|-

Player statistics

Season

Playoffs

Awards, records, and honors

Transactions

References

  Pacers on Basketball Reference

Indiana Pacers seasons
Pace
Pace
Indiana